Jan Blokhuijsen (born 1 April 1989) is an Olympic award-winning Dutch long-track speed skater who until 2013 skated for the commercial TVM team.

Career
He currently holds the world record in the team pursuit discipline, along with teammates Sven Kramer and Koen Verweij. At the 2014 Winter Olympics in Sochi, he won a silver medal in the Men's 5000 m competition. At the 2014 European allround championships in Hamar, Blokhuijsen won his first European title.  

In 2007, he got his VWO degree at school. After a successful period in skating and inline skating (in which he won several Dutch and European titles at the junior categories and a second place at the world championships in Korea) he decided to focus only on speedskating. In February 2008, he won the Dutch Allround Speed Skating Championships junior title at the ice rink of Groningen. Later in the same month, he became world champion at the junior world championships speedskating, where he finished in front of his teammates Koen Verweij and Berden de Vries. Together with them he also won the world title at the team pursuit.

Controversy

After the team pursuit event at the 2018 Winter Olympics in Pyeongchang, Blokhuijsen made a comment during a press conference to the host South Koreans to "treat dogs better in this country", criticizing dog meat consumption in the host nation. Many South Koreans perceived his comment was disrespectful, claiming it was racist and ignorant of Korean culture and the declining dog meat custom in the country. He later gave an apology for this comment on Twitter, which he deleted later.

Records

Personal records

As of 10 March 2020, Blokhuijsen is in 11th position in the adelskalender with a score of 146.253 points. Between 13 February 2011 and 11 October 2013 he held a personal best 6th place.

World records

 * together with Sven Kramer and Koen Verweij

Tournament overview

Source:

World Cup overview

 Source: 
– = Did not participate
* = 10000 meter
(b) = Division B
DNF = Did not finish
DQ = Disqualified

Medals won

References

1989 births
Dutch male speed skaters
Speed skaters at the 2010 Winter Olympics
Speed skaters at the 2014 Winter Olympics
Speed skaters at the 2018 Winter Olympics
Olympic speed skaters of the Netherlands
Medalists at the 2010 Winter Olympics
Medalists at the 2014 Winter Olympics
Medalists at the 2018 Winter Olympics
Olympic medalists in speed skating
Olympic gold medalists for the Netherlands
Olympic silver medalists for the Netherlands
Olympic bronze medalists for the Netherlands
People from Langedijk
Living people
World Allround Speed Skating Championships medalists
World Single Distances Speed Skating Championships medalists
Sportspeople from North Holland
20th-century Dutch people
21st-century Dutch people